"Uživo sa festivala Todo Mundo" (English: "Live from festival Todo Mundo") is album with traditional songs and music from Eastern Serbia performed by Svetlana Spajić and Bokan Stanković.

It includes a recording of a whole-evening performance at the Todo Mundo festival in Dom Omladine in Belgrade, March 23, 2013. It was published the same year on a CD by Belgrade publisher “Multimedia Music”.

The edition was included on the Top 10 list of best domestic world music albums in 2013, by the choice of “Disco 3000” show of Radio B92.

Track listing

Critical reception

Awards and prizes 
 Third place on the Top 10 list “The best world music album in Serbia for 2013”, by the choice of “Disco 3000” show of Radio B92.

References 

2013 albums
Live albums by Serbian artists
Live folk albums
Live world music albums
Svetlana Spajić albums